Yoma Bank Limited is one of Myanmar's largest commercial banks. It is the 4th-biggest bank in Myanmar. The bank is led by New Zealander Dean Cleland and has 80 branches across Myanmar.

Foundation and first years
Yoma Bank was founded in May 1993 by entrepreneur Serge Pun of the First Myanmar Investment Company (FMI). After receiving a full commercial banking license, Yoma Bank opened its first branch in August 1993. Since 1996, Yoma Bank expanded and has become one of the largest private banks in Myanmar. In 1999 Yoma became Myanmar's first bank with a computerized accounting system and started using wireless communication to connect to all of its branches via satellite. In 2001 Yoma Bank operated 41 branches in 24 cities.

Banking crisis
After the Myanmar banking crisis in 2003, Yoma Bank's license was limited, stopping the bank from accepting deposits or issuing loans. Yoma Bank focused on fee-based services such as remittances.

Full operations

In August 2012, the Central Bank of Myanmar reinstated Yoma Bank with a full banking license. Yoma Bank Chairman Pun stated the goal for the future development of the bank is "to be of international standard [yet a] local bank." To accomplish this, Yoma Bank began employing foreign managers and returning Burmese from abroad and focusing its service on small and medium-sized enterprises (SMEs). The International Finance Corporation (IFC), member of the World Bank Group, announced in May 2014 the long term plan to promote the Yoma Bank in its SME lending program with a loan of over $30 million.

In August 2014 Yoma Bank employed more than 2,200 employees in 51 branches. After signing the contract with the IFC, the bank received the first $5 million for its SME program in September 2014. Additionally the IFC agreed to assist Yoma Bank with installing a new core banking system and improving the bank's risk management and corporate governance.

In November 2014 Yoma Bank and the telecommunications firm, Telenor Myanmar announced their cooperation to provide mobile banking to Myanmar. The aim of the cooperation is to provide the non-banked access to financial services.

For the transformation of their core banking system, Yoma Bank decided in March 2015, to utilize "FusionBanking Essence" software from the British provider Misys.

Because of Yoma Bank's access to SMEs and international banking standards, the German development agency GIZ selected Yoma Bank in May 2015 as a partner for its program to promote SMEs in Myanmar.

In 2018, Yoma Bank introduced a new bank account service named JZü. JZü is a prize-linked account to encourage the habit of depositing money into bank accounts among the public. On top of a 3% annual interest rate, which is calculated daily and paid monthly, each account is included in a monthly draw for a chance to earn double the monthly minimum balance. To qualify for the monthly draw, JZü account holders will need to maintain a MMK 200,000 minimum balance in their account.

As of 2020, Yoma Bank has over 3,000 employees in its operations with over 80 branches nationwide.

See also
Economy of Myanmar
Kanbawza Bank Ltd
Myanmar May Flower Bank
List of banks in Myanmar
2003 Myanmar banking crisis

References

Banks of Myanmar
Banks established in 1993
1993 establishments in Myanmar
Companies based in Yangon